is a Japanese former professional footballer.

Uchida started his career with Kashima Antlers, making his debut in 2006 at the age of 17. After four years and three J1 League Titles, Uchida moved to Germany with Schalke 04 in 2010 for €1.3 million. With Schalke, Uchida won the 2010–11 DFB-Pokal, and was named in the Bundesliga team of the season twice between 2012 and 2014. He later played in the 2. Bundesliga with Union Berlin before returning to Japan with his first club Kashima Antlers, where he retired in 2020 at the age of 32.

Uchida made his first appearance for the Japan national team in January 2008, and went on to make 74 appearances for his country, representing them in the 2011 AFC Asian Cup, the 2013 FIFA Confederations Cup and the 2014 FIFA World Cup, as well as scoring two goals.

Club career

Kashima Antlers
Born in Kannami, Shizuoka, Japan, Uchida was educated at and played for Shimizu Higashi High School. During his time there, he played mainly in the wing position, partly because of his speed. The school's director Kazuo Umeda switched Uchida's position to the right–back position, in which he plays today. In 2006, Uchida moved to Kashima Antlers with a high school diploma.

On 5 March 2006, Uchida began his professional career when he debuted for Kashima at the age of 17 in the season-opener against Sanfrecce Hiroshima, since which he has remained a fixture in the starting eleven. His first goal as a professional footballer came on 21 March 2006 when he scored against Ventforet Kofu. Since making his debut, Uchida quickly became a first team regular for the side, playing in the right–back position. At the end of the 2006 season, he went on to make forty–one appearances and scoring two times in all competitions. For his performance, Uchida was selected by popular vote to play in the 2006 J. League All-Star Soccer game.

In the 2007 season, Uchida continued to regain his first team place for the side, playing in the right–back position. He later helped the club win the league for the first time since after beating Shimizu S-Pulse 3–0 in the last game of the season to regain the club's nine consecutive wins. In the final of the Emperor Cup, Uchida scored the opener in a 2–0 win over Sanfrecce Hiroshima to win the cup; resulting Kashima Antlers winning a double. For his performance, Uchida was selected by popular vote to play in the 2007 J. League All-Star Soccer game. At the end of the 2007 season, he went on to make forty–four appearances and scoring once in all competitions.

Uchida started the 2008 season when he started the whole game against Sanfrecce Hiroshima in the Japanese Super Cup, as Kashima Antlers lost 4–3 on penalties after the game finished 2–2 throughout extra time. Uchida also made his AFC Champions League debut, starting a match and played 76 minutes, in a 9–1 win against Krung Thai Bank on 12 March 2008. Seven days later on 19 March 2008, he set up two goals In his second AFC Champions League's appearance, in a 6–0 win against CLB Nam Định. Uchida continued to remain in the first team, where he helped the side keep a clean in the first two league matches. This lasted until he suffered a hip injury that kept him out for between two and three weeks. On 11 May 2008, Uchida made his return to the starting line-up, playing 82 minutes, as Kashima Antlers lost 1–0 against Shimizu S-Pulse. After returning, he quickly began playing in the receiver role later in the season. After missing four matches, due to his international commitment for the Summer Olympics, Uchida made his return to the starting line–up against Vissel Kobe on 27 August 2008, and helped Kashima Antlers win 2–1. He then helped the side keep three clean sheets in a row between 28 September 2008 and 4 October 2008. Uchida helped the side keep four clean sheets in a row between 9 November 2008 and 6 December 2008. During which, Uchida played a vital role when he scored the winning and only goal of the game against Oita Trinita on 23 November 2008, to help the side win the league for the second time. At the end of the 2008 season, where he made 34 appearances and scoring once in all competitions, Uchida was named J. League Best Eleven for the first time. In addition, Uchida signed a contract extension, keeping him until 2012.

Ahead of the 2009 season, Uchida was linked a move away from Kashima Antlers, as several clubs from Europe were interested in signing him. Uchida started the season well when he helped the side beat Gamba Osaka 2–0 to win the Japanese Super Cup. Uchida set up a goal for Marquinhos, in a 2–0 win over Urawa Red Diamonds in the opening game of the season. Uchida continued to regain his first team place, where he played in the right–back position. A month later on 8 April 2009, he scored his first goal of the season, in a 4–1 win over Warriors in the AFC Champions League campaign. Since the start of the 2009 season, Uchida started every match until he was dropped from the squad against JEF United Chiba on 2 May 2009, due to suffering from chronic fatigue. It came after when Uchida suffered fatigue and had to be substituted during a 5–0 win against Armed Forces on 22 April 2009. After missing one match, he made his return to the starting line-up and played 69 minutes, in a 2–1 win against Shimizu S-Pulse on 10 May 2009. A month later against FC Seoul in the round of 16 AFC Champions League, Uchida missed the decisive in the penalty shootout, resulting in the opposition team going through to the next round after the game finished 2–2 throughout 120 minutes. A week later against Kawasaki Frontale on 5 July 2009, however, he was sent–off for handball, resulting a penalty and was successfully converted by Juninho to give the opposition team a lead and the game finished 1–1. After serving a one match suspension, Uchida returned to the starting line-up, in a 2–2 draw against Kawasaki Frontale on 15 July 2009. Three days later on 18 July 2009, he made his 100th appearance for the side, in a 2–2 draw against Shimizu S-Pulse. His performance halfway through the season attracted interests from an unknown Serie A clubs, who made a 3 million euros bid. Despite this, Uchida continued to regain his first team place for the rest of the season. In the last game of the season, Uchida set up a goal for Shinzo Koroki to score the only goal in the game, in a 1–0 win over Urawa Red Diamonds to win the league for the third time running. At the end of the 2009, Uchida was named J. League Best Eleven for the second time. In addition, he went on to make the total of 43 appearances and scoring once for the side.

Ahead of the 2010 season, Uchida's performance continued to attract interests from European clubs. Amid the transfer move, he helped the side win the Japanese Super Cup after beating Gamba Osaka 5–3 on penalty shootout following the match being played throughout 120 minutes. At the start of the 2010 season, Uchida continued to feature in the first team in the right–back position for the side, as the club continued to remain in a good form. On 30 March 2010, he scored his first goal of the season, in a 3–1 win over Persipura Jayapura. After suffering a knee injury, he made his return from injury on 5 May 2010, in a 2–1 loss against Cerezo Osaka, in what turned out to be his last league appearance for the club. His last appearance for the club came on 12 May 2010, in a 1–0 loss against Pohang Steelers. By the time he departed from Kashima Antlers, Uchida went on to make seventeen appearances and scoring once in all competitions.

Schalke 04

On 13 June 2010, German club Schalke 04 announced that they had signed the Japanese international to a three-year contract for €1.3 million. It came after when they sold Rafinha to Genoa.

Uchida made his Schalke 04 debut, where he played the whole game, in a 2–0 loss against Bayern Munich in the DFL-Supercup. Soon after, Uchida made his league debut for the club in the opening game of the season, coming on as a second–half substitute for Joël Matip, in a 2–1 loss against Hamburger SV. After being absent out from the first team, due to injury in September, he returned to the first team on 25 September 2010, in a 2–2 draw against Borussia Mönchengladbach. After returning to the first team, Manager Felix Magath commented on Uchida's performance, saying: "He still lacks physical robustness, but he sets the best accents forward." Four days later, on 29 September 2010, he made his Champions League debut for the club, starting the whole game, in a 2–0 win over Benfica. After missing one match, Uchida made his return to the starting line-up in the right–back position against Stuttgart on 16 October 2010 and the match resulted in a 2–2 draw. He then helped the club's defence by keeping three clean sheets in a row between 4 December 2010 and 18 December 2010. After missing out throughout January, due to international commitment for the 2011 AFC Asian Cup, Uchida made his return to the starting line-up against Borussia Dortmund on 4 February 2011 and helped the club's defence keep a clean sheet, in a 0–0 draw. This was followed up by helping the club another clean sheet, in a 1–0 win against SC Freiburg. Following a 2–1 win against Eintracht Frankfurt on 12 March 2011, Uchida wore a shirt which in response to the Tōhoku earthquake and tsunami, saying: "Dear friends in Japan. Hoping that many lives will be saved. Let's stand together. This misfortune is very, very close to me. I keep in touch with Japan." Since returning to the first team, he managed to regain his first team place in the right–back position for the rest of the season. On 13 April 2011, Uchida became the first Japanese footballer to play for a team that reached the semi-finals of the Champion's League. Despite the club did not reach the final, Uchida came on as a late second–half substitute for Peer Kluge, as the club beat MSV Duisburg 5–0 in the DFB-Pokal Final. In his first season at Schalke 04, Uchida went on to make the total of 43 appearances in all competitions.

In the 2011–12 season, Uchida appeared on the substitute bench for the first three league matches and DFL-Supercup, with Marco Höger preferred. He soon made his first appearance of the season for the side, playing in the left–back position, as Schalke 04 lost 2–0 against HJK Helsinki on 18 August 2011 in the first leg of the UEFA Europa League Qualification Round. Uchida revert to his right–back position against the opposition team in a return and managed to overcome the deficit by winning 6–1 to reach the Group Stage. On 28 August 2011, he finally made his first league appearance of the season, in a 1–0 win over Borussia Mönchengladbach. However, Uchida tore a muscle in his right thigh during training and was sidelined a month. On 3 November 2011, he made his return to the starting line-up, starting the whole game, in a 0–0 draw against AEK Larnaca in the UEFA Europa League Group Stage match. Throughout the most of the 2011–12 season, Uchida and Höger competed over the right–back position, although he suffered his own injury concern himself. Later in the 2011–12 season, Uchida managed to regain his first team place at Schalke 04 after Höger began to play in the right–midfield position. The club's general manager Horst Heldt commented on his performance, saying: "We have already started discussions on this. He has a top attitude towards work and club. Uchida was "not yet finished with his development." At the end of the 2011–12 season, Uchida made the total of 26 appearances in all competitions.

Ahead of the 2012–13 season, it was announced by the club that Uchida signed a two-year professional contract extension to 30 June 2015. He was featured in the first two league matches before dropped in favour of Benedikt Höwedes. For the next two months, Uchida returned to the starting line-up, playing in the right–back position. On 3 November 2012, he scored his first goal for the club, in a 3–2 loss against 1899 Hoffenheim. However, he suffered a muscle injury and was out for two weeks. After missing two matches due to injury,  Uchida returned to the starting line-up, in a 1–1 draw against Eintracht Frankfurt on 24 November 2012. He managed to regain his first team place for the next seven matches before suffering from injuries for the second time this season. On 9 March 2013, Uchida returned to the starting line-up and  played a vital role in the Revierderby against Borussia Dortmund, setting up two goals in a 2–1 win. Following this, he went to regain his first team place for the remaining matches of the 2012–13 season and helped the side to finish fourth place, therefore qualifying for the UEFA Champions League next season. At the end of the 2012–13 season, made the total of 30 appearances and scoring once in all competitions. For his performance, Uchida was named Bundesliga Team of the Season.

In the 2013–14 season, Uchida started in the first two league matches before suffering a muscle injury, which he made a quick recovery. On 21 August 2013, he made his return from injury, starting the whole game, in a 1–1 draw against PAOK in the first leg of the UEFA Champions League Play–Offs Round; after the match, German newspaper Der Westen gave him a lowest score of the game. In a return leg, he set up the open goal of the game for Ádám Szalai, in a 3–2 win over PAOK to help the team reach the group stage of the Champions League. A month later, he scored his first goal in the Champions League in a 3–0 win against Steaua București on 18 September 2013. In a 4–1 win over Augsburg on 5 October 2013, he set up two goals for the side. Following his return, Uchida regained his first team place for the side, playing in the right–back position. However, by mid–December, he found himself in the sidelined, due to injury and suspension. Uchida, however, suffered a torn tendon during a 2–0 win over Hannover 96 on 9 February 2014 and was sidelined for the rest of the season. At the end of the 2013–14 season, he went on to make a total of 27 appearances and scoring once in all competitions. By May, Uchida managed to recover from his injury, just in time for him to be picked for the World Cup.

However at the start of the 2014–15 season, Uchida suffered a patella tendon irritation. On 23 September 2014, he returned to the first team from injury, starting the whole game, in a 3–0 win over Werder Bremen. After the match, Manager Jens Keller praised Uchida's performance, saying: "Great respect for Uchida. He did not play for seven months and then delivers such a game - really great!" After a good performance since returning from injury, Uchida signed a three–year contract, keeping him until 2018. Shortly after signing a contract, Uchida set up a goal for Huntelaar to score the only goal in the game, in a 1–0 win over Augsburg on 31 October 2014. By the end of the Month, Uchida was awarded October's Player of the Month for his performance.  Since returning to the first team from injury, Uchida continued to regain his first team place, playing in the right–back position. Towards the end of the 2014–15 season, he soon found himself as a part-time player and was demoted to the substitute bench. However, Uchida was eventually injured on two occasions, including another Patella problems that kept him out for the rest of the season. At the end of the 2014–15 season, Uchida went on to make the total of 20 appearances in all competitions.

However, ahead of the 2015–16 season, Uchida undergone an operation on his patellar tendons, which saw him sidelined for six weeks. By October, he said he's recovering, though he hasn't confirm the date of his return. Though he returned to training in January, Uchida, however, suffered a knee injury that saw him out for the rest of the season.

Ahead of the 2016–17 season, Uchida returned to training in the pre–season tour. However, his return to training was short–lived, as he suffered another injury once again. After suffering another injury in November, he made his first appearance in a year on 7 December 2016, in a 2–0 loss against Red Bull Salzburg in the UEFA Europa League match. This turns out to be his only appearance, as he suffered injuries once more twice later in the season. After leaving Schalke 04, where Uchida made 153 appearances and scoring two times in all competitions, he was given a farewell send-off before a Schalke 04 match.

Union Berlin
On 21 August 2017, Uchida joined 2. Bundesliga side Union Berlin on a one-year contract. Schalke allowed him to leave on a free transfer and "accommodated him financially" following his seven-year stay at the club.

Uchida made his Union Berlin debut on 10 September 2017 in a 3–2 loss against Fortuna Düsseldorf. Having been brought on as a substitute in the 75th minute he assisted for his club's temporary 2–1 lead three minutes later, an own goal by Kaan Ayhan. On 19 September, he made his first start in a 1–0 loss against SV Sandhausen. He played no further match before sustaining a thigh injury in mid-October. Having made just two appearances before the winter break, he left Union Berlin to return to his native Japan signing with former club Kashima Antlers. It came after when Uchida wanted to return to his homeland country.

Return to Kashima Antlers
On 2 January 2018, Uchida re-joined J1 team Kashima Antlers after playing seven and a half years in Germany. Uchida is scheduled to join his teammates in Kashima on 9 January 2018, shortly before the start of the 2018 J1 season.

Uchida made his first Kashima Antlers’ appearance in eight years, starting a match and played 84 minutes, in a 0–0 draw against Shimizu S-Pulse in the opening game of the season. But he soon suffered a thigh injury that kept him out for a month. On 14 April 2018, Uchida made his return from injury, starting a match and played 77 minutes, in a 2–0 win against Nagoya Grampus. He appeared in the next four matches before being sidelined with another injury. On 11 July 2018, when Uchida made his return from injury, starting the whole game, in a 4–1 win against Machida Zelvia. However, he found himself in and out of the starting line-up, due to being on the substitute bench and facing his own injury concern. Uchida then played an important role when he scored the winning goal, in a 3–2 win against Suwon Samsung Bluewings on 3 October 2018; which in the return leg, Kashima Antlers drew 3–3, resulting Kashima Antlers reaching the AFC Champions League Final for the first time. However, Uchida suffered a hamstring injury that kept him out for a month. While on the sidelines, Kashima Antlers won the AFC Champions League Final against Persepolis by beating them 2–0 aggregate to win the club's first AFC Champions League trophy. On 24 November 2018, he made his return from injury, coming on as a late substitute, in a 3–0 win against Vegalta Sendai. In the FIFA Club World Cup, Uchida played three times for the side, as they finished fourth place in the tournament. At the end of the 2018 season, he went on to twenty–three appearances and scoring once in all competitions.

Ahead of the 2019 season, Uchida was appointed as the new Kashima Antlers’ captain following the departure of Gen Shoji. His first match as captain came on 1 March 2019 against Kawasaki Frontale and set up an equalising goal for Sho Ito, in a 1–1 draw. He later captained three more matches between 9 March 2019 and 30 March 2019. However, during a 3–2 win against Júbilo Iwata on 30 March 2019, Uchida suffered a knee injury and was substituted that kept him out for several months. On 14 August 2019, he made his return from injury, coming on as a late substitute, in a 4–0 win against Tochigi SC in the third round of the Emperor's Cup. Since returning from injury, Uchida resumed his captaincy role despite being placed on the substitute bench in a number of matches for the rest of the 2019 season. Kashima Antlers went on to finish third place in the league. At the end of the 2019 season, he went on to make twelve appearances in all competitions.

At the start of the 2020 season, Uchida appeared as an unused substitute for the AFC Champions League against Melbourne Victory on 28 January 2020, as the club lost 1–0. Shortly after, he suffered a calf injury during a friendly match against Mito HollyHock on 1 February 2020, as Kashima Antlers won 1–0. After the match, it was announced that Uchida was sidelined for four weeks. However, the season was interrupted due to the pandemic and it was pushed back to July, allowing him to have more time to recover. Once the league resumed, he made his first appearance of the season, starting a match and played 60 minutes before being substituted, in a 2–1 loss against Kawasaki Frontale on 4 July 2020. A month later on 12 August 2020, Uchida captained the club for the first time this season, starting the match and played 69 minutes before being substituted, in a 3–2 win against Shimizu S-Pulse in a J.League Cup match. Eight days later on 20 August 2020, he announced his retirement from professional football. Three days later on 23 August 2020, Uchida made his last appearance in professional football against Gamba Osaka, coming on as a 16th-minute substitute for the injured Rikuto Hirose, as Kashima Antlers drew 1–1. After the match, he spoke at his retirement ceremony, thanking the club and hope the new generation would hear his story in hopes of becoming a professional football. Following this, Uchida went on to make three appearances in all competitions.

Post-playing career
Following his retirement from professional football, Uchida moved to coaching when he was appointed as a role model coach for Japan U19. However, Uchida previously ruled out being a manager, citing as leadership to be difficult.

International career

Youth team

Uchida represented Japan at several underage levels. Uchida was part of the Japan team for the 2006 AFC Youth Championship finals hosted by India. He helped the Japan's defence with two clean sheets in the first two matches in the Group Stage, which saw the side through to the knockout stage. Uchida later helped Japan reach the finals of the AFC Youth Championship by beating South Korea and Saudi Arabia. However, Japan finished runners-up after losing to North Korea on penalties.

Uchida also took part in the 2007 FIFA U-20 World Cup finals hosted by Canada. He played his first match of the tournament and helped the side beat Scotland 2–1. This was followed up by helping Japan keep a clean sheet in the next two matches, which saw them go through to the knockout stage. However, the national side were eliminated by Czech Republic after losing on penalties.

In July 2008, Uchida was called up to Japan U23 squad for the 2008 Summer Olympics. He played his first match of the tournament, starting the whole game, as Japan U23 lost 1–0 against United States. Uchida went on to make two appearances for the side in the tournament, as Japan were eliminated in the Group Stage.

Senior team

On two occasions between December 2007 and January 2008, Uchida received an international call-up from national coach Ivica Osim but did not play any game. Uchida finally made a full international debut for Japan on 26 January 2008 in a friendly against Chile at National Olympic Stadium in Tokyo. This was the first match under the reign of new manager Takeshi Okada. The results was a 0–0 draw. In a follow–up match against Bosnia and Herzegovina, he helped Japan keep another clean sheet, in a 3–0 win. On 6 February 2008, Uchida played 90 minutes for Japan in a 4–1 win against Thailand and became the first teenage Japanese footballer to play FIFA World Cup qualification after the establishment of the J. League in 1993. On 22 June 2008, Uchida scored the winner in a 1–0 win against Bahrain. It was his first international goal and Uchida became the youngest Japanese goalscorer in FIFA World Cup qualification at age 20 years and 87 days, beating an 11-year-old record that was held by Hidetoshi Nakata. Throughout 2008, he dispatched the right–back position from Yūichi Komano and Yūichi Komano.

Uchida started 2009 when he set up two goals, in a 5–1 win against Finland on 5 February 2009. In June 2009, he was featured in two of the three World Cup qualifying matches, which resulted in Japan qualified for the tournament. Later in the year, Uchida helped Japan keep four clean sheets in a row between 10 October 2009 and 18 November 2009, all of them were friendly matches.

In February 2010, Uchida was called up to the national squad for the East Asian Football Championship. He helped the side keep two clean sheets in the first two matches. However, Japan's loss to South Korea in Matchday 3 meant that Japan finished third place in the tournament. Uchida was a member of the Japan team for the 2010 World Cup squad, being called up in May 2010. However, Uchida appeared as a substitute for all the World Cup matches, as he failed to dispatch a right–back place from Yūichi Komano. After the tournament, Uchida said he was disappointed in himself for not playing in the World Cup and hope his move to Schalke 04 would make him a better player.

In December 2010, Uchida was called up for the 2011 AFC Asian Cup in Qatar. He played all the first three matches in the tournament and helped Japan reach the knockout stage. However, Uchida was suspended for the quarter–final against Qatar after being booked two times on different occasions. He returned to the starting line-up, playing against South Korea in the semi–finals and played the whole game, as Japan beat the opposition team 3–2 in the penalty shoot–out following the match being played for 120 minutes, in a 2–2 draw. In the AFC Asian Cup Final against Australia, Uchida started and played 120 minutes, as they beat the Socceroos 1–0 to win the AFC Asian Cup, thanks to Tadanari Lee. Later in the year, he helped Japan keep three clean sheets in three Japan's matches between 7 June 2011 and 2 September 2011.

Two years later, Uchida was called up to the national side for the 2013 Confederations Cup squad. He was featured three times in the tournament, as Japan loss all three matches and was eliminated in the Group Stage. At one point after losing to Brazil, Brazilian media gave Uchida's performance the lowest score out of the match.

In May 2014, Uchida was called up to the 2014 World Cup squad. Prior to this, Uchida was involved in three friendly matches, which a game against Cyprus on 27 May 2014, he scored his second international goal for the club. Unlike the previous World Cup, Uchida started all three matches in the World Cup, which saw Japan eliminated from the Group Stage. Following Japan's elimination, he hinted about retirement from the national team. A month later, Uchida later reflected about playing in the World Cup.

Expecting to be picked for the AFC Asian Cup, Uchida, however, was cut from the squad ahead of the tournament. It was revealed that he was recovering from his injury. Uchida returned to the national side two months later, playing two times for the side.

Personal life
Outside of football, Uchida is considered a massively popular figure in his native country of Japan. During a match against 1. FC Nürnberg on 26 February 2011, 90 women from Japan visited the Veltins-Arena to see Uchida play, and his popularity has led to him being referred to as a Japanese Beckham. Uchida's popularity during his time at Schalke 04 led to the club launching an official Japanese website and Twitter account. German newspaper Der Westen mentioned his popularity and that he could earn a cult following at Schalke 04.

Outside of football, Uchida provided the voice for Uschi, who is named after him, in the Pokémon movie Diancie and the Cocoon of Destruction. He does nor drink alcohol, preferring to drink banana juice. Growing up, Uchida said his favourite manga was Captain Tsubasa and supported Júbilo Iwata. Since May 2015, Uchida has been married to Yuko Aoki and together, the couple have two daughters.

Earlier in his football career, Uchida said he was considering enrolling to university to obtain a teacher's license. In April 2016, Uchida and his teammate Yuya Osako opened a football training facility in Kashima. Three years later in June, the pair released an exercise book. During his Japan's career, teammate Maya Yoshida claimed that he is best friends with Uchida, yet a fellow competitor.

In December 2008, Uchida signed for an agency with Tetsuro Kiyooka, a FIFA Players' Agent (Sports agent), in hopes of moving to Europe. It worked when he joined Schalke 04 two years later after signing for Tetsuro Kiyooka. During his time at Schalke 04, Uchida lived in Düsseldorf.

Career statistics

Club

International

Scores and results list Japan's goal tally first, score column indicates score after each Uchida goal.

Honours
Kashima Antlers
J. League Division 1: 2007, 2008, 2009
Emperor's Cup: 2007
Japanese Super Cup: 2009, 2010
AFC Champions League: 2018

Schalke 04
DFB-Pokal: 2010–11
DFL-Supercup: 2011

Japan
AFC Asian Cup: 2011

Individual
J.League Best XI: 2008, 2009
Bundesliga Team of the Season: 2012–13, 2013–14

References

External links
 Atsuto Uchida on Instagram

1988 births
Living people
Association football fullbacks
Association football people from Shizuoka Prefecture
Japanese footballers
Japan youth international footballers
Japan international footballers
J1 League players
Bundesliga players
2. Bundesliga players
Kashima Antlers players
FC Schalke 04 players
1. FC Union Berlin players
Olympic footballers of Japan
Footballers at the 2008 Summer Olympics
2010 FIFA World Cup players
2011 AFC Asian Cup players
AFC Asian Cup-winning players
2013 FIFA Confederations Cup players
2014 FIFA World Cup players
Japanese expatriate footballers
Expatriate footballers in Germany
Japanese expatriate sportspeople in Germany